"Hard Act to Follow" is a song by Australian rock band Grinspoon and was released as the lead single from their fourth studio album Thrills, Kills & Sunday Pills. It  reached No. 24 on the ARIA Singles Chart and was ranked #16 on Triple J's Hottest 100 of 2004.

The song was written by Phil Jamieson and Pat Davern.

The song was performed by Grinspoon at the closing ceremony of the 2006 Commonwealth Games.

Track listing
 "Hard Act to Follow" - 3:28
 "Nasty" - 3:17
 "Find Your Own Way Home" - 2:45
 "Hurricane" - 5:13
 "Hard Act to Follow" (Video)

Charts

References 

2004 singles
Grinspoon songs
2004 songs
Universal Records singles
Song recordings produced by Howard Benson
Songs written by Phil Jamieson
Songs written by Pat Davern